Ostrov means "island" in several Slavic languages and in Romanian. It may refer to:

Places

Bulgaria
Ostrov, Vratsa Province, a village in Oryahovo Municipality

Czech Republic
Ostrov (Karlovy Vary District), a town in the Karlovy Vary Region
Ostrov (Chrudim District), a municipality and village in the Pardubice Region
Ostrov (Benešov District), a municipality and village in the Central Bohemian Region
Ostrov (Příbram District), a municipality and village in the Central Bohemian Region
Ostrov (Ústí nad Orlicí District), a municipality and village in the Pardubice Region
Ostrov (Havlíčkův Brod District), a municipality and village in the Vysočina Region
Ostrov u Bezdružic, a municipality and village in the Plzeň Region
Ostrov u Macochy, a market town in the South Moravian Region
Ostrov nad Oslavou, a market town in the Vysočina Region

Romania
Ostrov, Constanța, a commune in Constanţa County
Ostrov, Tulcea, a commune in Tulcea County
Ostrov, a village in Birchiș Commune, Arad County
Ostrov, a village in Râu de Mori Commune, Hunedoara County
Ostrov, a village in Osica de Sus Commune, Olt County

Russia
Ostrov Urban Settlement, a municipal formation which the town of Ostrov in Ostrovsky District of Pskov Oblast, Russia is incorporated as
Ostrov (inhabited locality), several inhabited localities
Ostrov (air base), an air base in Pskov Oblast

Slovakia
Ostrov, Sobrance, a village
Ostrov, Piešťany, a village

Other uses
Ostrov, or The Island (2006 film), a Russian film
Ostrovat, or The Island (2011 film), a Bulgarian film

See also
Ostriv (disambiguation) (Ukrainian form)
Ostrów (disambiguation) (Polish form)
Ostrovo (disambiguation)
Ostrowo (disambiguation)
Ostrau (disambiguation) (Germanized form)